Jasper Alexander Thirlby Conran  (born 12 December 1959) is an English designer. He has worked on collections of womenswear and for the home, as well as productions for the stage in ballet, opera and theatre.

Early life
He is the second son of Sir Terence Conran, a designer, and Shirley Pearce, an author; his parents divorced when he was two years of age. He was educated at Port Regis School and Bryanston School in the 1970s; he also studied at the Parsons School of Art and Design in New York, United States (US).

Career
Conran's first collection was for Henri Bendel in New York City. In 1978, aged 19, Conran designed his first womenswear collection under his own name. The following year he was elected to be part of the London Designer collections. Conran designed his first menswear collection in 1985. Conran designed the wedding dress of Princess Margaret's daughter, Lady Sarah Chatto (formerly Lady Sarah Armstrong-Jones) in 1994. He also designed clothes for Diana, Princess of Wales.

In 1989 Conran collaborated with Land Rover Ltd on the interior of the then new Land Rover Discovery.

In 1999, he began designing a signature range of stemware for Stuart Crystal and later for Waterford Crystal. In 2001, he launched a fine bone china tableware collection for Wedgwood.

In 1996, Conran launched a womenswear range for the Debenhams chain of department stores in the UK. He has subsequently designed women's accessories, lingerie, hosiery, menswear, men's accessories, childrenswear, and homeware for the company.

Conran has released furnishing, fabric and wallpaper collections for Designers Guild, as well as a range of signature fragrances and luggage.

In 2004, Conran designed and launched a three-range fireplace collection for Chesney's. He launched the Jasper Conran Optical in 2008.

Conran was a Governor at Bryanston School from 2007-2009 and a trustee of The Architecture Foundation (2010 - 2012) and the Wallace Collection (2007 - 2015).

Conran is the chairman and chief executive of Jasper Conran Holdings Ltd. Conran was appointed Creative Director of The Conran Shop in 2011, and, in 2012, Conran was appointed as the chairman where he spent three years conceiving and implementing a strategy to reinvigorate and reposition the business. In March 2014, Conran was appointed Chairman of Conran Holdings Ltd, stepping down in 2015.

Conran published his first book, Jasper Conran Country in 2010. The 300-page photographic essay was completed during a year of exploration around the English countryside.

In 2016 Conran opened his first hotel in the heart of the Medina in Marrakesh, L'Hotel Marrakech. In 2017 L'Hôtel Marrakech was listed as 1 of 75 in the Hot List 2017: Best New Hotels in the World, Condé Nast Traveler USA and 1 of 55 'Best New Hotels in the World by Conde Nast Traveller UK. In 2018 L'Hôtel Marrakech was included on the Condé Nast Traveler USA Gold List 2018. Condé Nast Traveler USA and Condé Nast Traveler UK both listed L'Hôtel Marrakech as one of their editors all-time favourite hotels on their respective 2019 Gold Lists.

Conran has served several times on the British Fashion Council, and is a Visiting Professor at the University of the Arts London.

Performing arts
Throughout his career, Conran has pursued his passion for the performing arts—he has designed costumes and sets for fourteen ballet, opera and theatre productions.

Conran collaborated with David Bintley on the Royal Ballet's production of Tombeaux, held at Covent Garden, and a series of productions by the Birmingham Royal Ballet, including The Nutcracker Sweeties, Brahms/Handel Variations, The Shakespeare Suite and Arthur Part I & II. He also designed the set and costumes for Bintley's The Compleat Consort, produced for the Bayerisches Staatsballett in Munich, Germany.

Other works include the production of My Fair Lady directed by Simon Callow, Donzetti's opera Maria Stuarda for ENO and Galina Samsova's productions of Swan Lake and The Sleeping Beauty for the Scottish Ballet.

In 1991, Conran won the Laurence Olivier Award for Costume Design for Jean Anouilh's The Rehearsal at the Almeida Theatre in London, UK.

Full list of productions
The Rehearsal, Jean Anouilh, 1991 (Laurence Olivier Award, 1991)
My Fair Lady, Simon Callow, 1992 
Tombeaux, David Bintley, 1993, Royal Opera House
Sleeping Beauty, Galina Samsova, 1994, Scottish Ballet
Brahms/Handel Variations, David Bintley, 1994, Birmingham Royal Ballet
Stravinsky Symphony in C, 1994, Bavarian State Opera, Munich
The Complete Consort, David Bintley, 1994, Bayerisches Staatsballett, Munich 
Swan Lake, Galina Samsova, 1995, Scottish Ballet
Edward II, David Bintley, 1995, Birmingham Royal Ballet
The Nutcracker Sweeties, David Bintley, 1996, Birmingham Royal Ballet
Maria Stuarda, Donizetti, 1998, English National Opera
The Shakespeare Suite, David Bintley, 1999, Birmingham Royal Ballet
Arthur Part I, David Bintley, 2000, Birmingham Royal Ballet
Arthur Part II, David Bintley, 2001, Birmingham Royal Ballet
Within the Golden Hour, Christopher Wheeldon, 2019, Royal Opera House

Private life
Conran is openly gay. In 2009, he was ranked number 66 in the annual Pink List of 100 influential gay and lesbian people in Britain, published by The Independent on Sunday. In 2010, this list described him as a "National Treasure". In December 2015, he married Irish artist and performer Oisin Byrne.
For a time Conran lived at Flemings Hall in Bedingfield, Suffolk.

The house was previously owned by his stepmother, Caroline Conran, a food writer who was married to his father from 1963 until 1996, and purchased the house as a weekend refuge for herself in 1986.

Awards
1982: Fil d'Or International Linen Award
1983: Fil d'Or International Linen Award
1986: Designer of the Year by the British Fashion Council
1987: Fashion Group of America Award
1991: The Laurence Olivier Award for 'Costume Designer of the Year' – Jean Anouilh's "The Rehearsal"
1991: The British Fashion Council's British Collections Award
2003: 'The Prince's Medal', Homes and Gardens Classic Design Award
2004: Honorary Doctorate from Heriot-Watt University
2005: The Design and Decoration 'Objects of Desire' Award
2006: Honorary Doctor of Civil Law at the University of East Anglia.
2006: Homes and Gardens 'Classic Design' Award
2008: Appointed Officer of the Order of the British Empire (OBE) in the 2008 New Year Honours for services to retail industry.
2011: Condé Nast Traveller:Innovation & Design Award for 'Style on the Move' with Tripp Luggage

Bibliography
 Country. Conran Octopus, 2010.

References

External links
 

1959 births
Living people
English fashion designers
People educated at Bryanston School
Parsons School of Design alumni
English LGBT people
Officers of the Order of the British Empire
Jasper
High fashion brands
British brands
Clothing brands of the United Kingdom
People educated at Port Regis School
LGBT fashion designers